Charles Herschel Sisam (8 September 1879, Cedar Rapids, Iowa – 4 December 1964) was an American mathematician.

He received his B.A. in 1902 from the University of Michigan and then his M.A. in 1903 and Ph.D. in 1906, under the supervision of Virgil Snyder, from Cornell University. While working on his Ph.D., Sisam was a mathematics instructor at the United States Naval Academy from 1904 to 1906. He was an instructor in 1906–1907, a research associate in 1907–1909, and an assistant professor in 1909–1918 at the University of Illinois. From 1918 to 1948 he was a full professor at Colorado College. He did research on algebraic surfaces and was an Invited Speaker at the ICM in 1928 in Bologna. He was on the editorial staff of the Transactions of the American Mathematical Society from 1930 to 1936.

Sisam married and was the father of a daughter.

Selected publications

Articles

Books
 (Ph.D. thesis, 1905)
with Virgil Snyder:

References

Algebraic geometers
University of Michigan alumni
Cornell University alumni
University of Illinois faculty
Colorado College faculty
1879 births
1964 deaths
People from Cedar Rapids, Iowa